The archdiocese of Granada is an ecclesiastical province of the Catholic Church in Spain. Originally the diocese of Elvira from the 3rd century through the 10th, it was re-founded in 1437 as the diocese of Granada and was elevated to the rank of a metropolitan archdiocese by Pope Alexander VI on 10 December 1492. Its suffragan sees are Almería, Cartagena, Guadix, Jaén and Málaga.

The archdiocese's mother church and thus seat of its archbishop is the Cathedral of the Incarnation in Granada also houses the Basilicas of San Juan de Dios and Nuestra Señora de las Angustias. The current archbishop of Granada is Francisco Martínez Fernández, appointed by Pope John Paul II on 15 March 2003.

Ordinaries

Bishops of Elvira
The following list is based on the Nomina defunctorum episcoporum Spalensis sedis uel Toletane atque Eliberritane sedis ("Names of the deceased bishops of the see of Seville and of the sees of Toledo and Elvira"), a necrology of bishops of those sees found in the Codex Emilianense, which was compiled between 962 and 994.

Caecilius (1st century), legendary
 Leubesind
 Ameantus
 Ascanius
 Julian
 Augustulus
 Marturius
 Gregory I
 Peter I
 Fabian (c. 300–306)
 Honasterius
 Optatus
 Peter II
 Zoilus
 Gregory II (c. 350 – c. 390)
 John I
 Valerius
 Lusidius
 John II
 John III
 Ursus
 John IV
 John V
 Mantius
 Respectus
 Caritonus or Orontius (fl. 516)
 Peter III
 Vincent
 Honorius
 Stephen (fl. 589)
 Baddo or Batonius (fl. 597)
 Bissinus (fl. 610–619)
 Felix
 Iterius (fl. 633–646)
 Aga (fl. 653)
 Anthony
 Argebad or Argibadonius (fl. 681–683)
 Argemir
 Bapiria
 John VI (fl. 688)
 Ceterius (fl. 693)
 Trectemund
 Dadila
 Adica
 Balduigius
 Egila (c. 777–785)
 Daniel
 Gervase I
 Turibius
 Agila
 Gebuldo
 Sintila
 Samuel I (850–864)
 Gervase II
 Reccared
 Manila
 Sennaion
 Nifridius (fl. 939)
 Samuel II
 Pantaleon
 Gundafor
 Pirricius
 Gapio
 Recemund (fl. 962), the last known bishop of Elvira

Bishops of Granada
Gonzalo de Vallebuena, O.F.M. (13 Sep 1437 – 1442 died) 
Juan de Haterano (19 Dec 1442 – 1446)
Diego de Guadalajara (9 Jan 1447 – c. 1470)
Fernando de Castilla, O.S.B. (10 Dec 1473 – 1479 died)
Juan de Pastor (23 July 1479 – ????)

Archbishops of Granada

Hernando de Talavera, O.S.H. (23 Jan 1493 – 14 May 1507 died)
Antonio de Rojas Manrique (1507 – 1524 Appointed, Patriarch of the West Indies)
Francisco Herrera Ruesta (8 Jun 1524 – Dec 1524 died) 
Pedro Portocarrero (archbishop) (26 Jun 1525 – 5 Jun 1526 died) 
Pedro Ramírez de Alba, O.S.H. (19 Dec 1526 – 21 Jun 1528 died) 
Gaspar de Ávalos de la Cueva (22 Jan 1529 – 29 Mar 1542 Appointed, Archbishop of Santiago de Compostela) 
Fernando Niño de Guevara (patriarch) (22 Mar 1542 – 8 Oct 1546 Appointed, Patriarch of the West Indies) 
Pedro Guerrero Logrono (Mendoza) (28 Oct 1546 – 2 Apr 1576 died) 
Juan Méndez de Salvatierra (11 Sep 1577 – 24 May 1588 died) 
Pedro Castro Quiñones (6 Dec 1589 – 5 Jul 1610 Appointed, Archbishop of Sevilla) 
Pedro González de Mendoza, O.F.M. (19 Jul 1610 – 8 Feb 1616 Appointed, Archbishop of Zaragoza) 
Felipe Tarsis de Acuña, O.S. (24 Feb 1616 – 20 Jun 1620 died)
Garcerán Albañell (16 Nov 1620 – 10 Mar 1626 died) 
Agustin Spinola Basadone (7 Sep 1626 – 23 Oct 1630 Appointed, Archbishop of Santiago de Compostela) 
Miguel Santos de Sampedro (13 Nov 163  – 11 Mar 1631 died) 
Fernando Valdés Llano (18 Jul 1633 – 30 Dec 1639 died) 
Martín Carrillo Alderete (1 Jul 1641 – 29 Jun 1653 died)
Antonio Calderon (bishop) (12 Jan 1654 – 12 Jul 1654 died)
José de Argáiz Pérez (27 Jul 1654 – 28 May 1667 died) 
Diego Escolano y Ledesma (27 Feb 1668 – 4 Sep 1672 died) 
Francisco de Rois y Mendoza, O. Cist. (29 May 1673 – 16 Mar 1677 died) 
Alfonso Bernardo de los Ríos y Guzmán, O.SS.T. (13 Sep 1677 – 5 Oct 1692 died) 
Martín Ascargorta (18 May 1693 – 25 Feb 1719 died) 
Francisco Eustaquio Perea Porras (3 Jul 1720 – 26 Jun 1733 died) 
Felipe de los Tueros Huerta (20 Jan 1734 – 12 Sep 1751 died) 
Onésimo Salamanca Zaldívar (20 Mar 1752 – 19 Dec 1757 Appointed, Archbishop of Burgos) 
Pedro Antonio Barroeta y Ángel (19 Dec 1757 – 20 Mar 1775 died) 
Antonio Jorge y Galván (29 Jan 1776 – 2 Sep 1787 died) 
Basilio Tomás Sancho y Hernando (de Santas Justa y Rufina), Sch. P. (17 Dec 1787 Appointed – Did Not Take Effect) 
Juan Manuel Moscoso y Peralta (3 Aug 1789 – 24 Jul 1811 died) 
Blas Joaquín Álvarez de Palma (19 Dec 1814 – 29 Nov 1837 died) 
Luis Antonio Folgueras y Sión (17 Jan 1848 – 28 Oct 1850 died) 
Salvador José Reyes y García de Lara (5 Sep 1851 – 31 Mar 1865 died) 
Bienvenido Monzón y Martín (8 Jun 1866 Confirmed – 27 Mar 1885 Appointed, Archbishop of Sevilla)
José Moreno y Mazón (27 Mar 1885 – 17 Jan 1905 died) 
José Meseguer y Costa (27 Mar 1905 – 9 Dec 1920 died) 
Vicente Casanova y Marzol (7 Mar 1921 – 23 Oct 1930 died) 
Agustín Parrado y García (4 Apr 1934  – 8 Oct 1946 died) 
Balbino Santos Olvera (24 Nov 1946 – 14 Feb 1953 died) 
Rafael García y García de Castro (9 May 1953 – 3 Feb 1974 died) 
Emilio Benavent Escuín (3 Feb 1974 Succeeded – 25 May 1977 Appointed, Archbishop (Personal Title) of Spain, Military) 
José Méndez Asensio (31 Jan 1978 – 10 Dec 1996 Retired) 
Antonio Cañizares Llovera (10 Dec 1996 – 24 Oct 2002 Appointed, Archbishop of Toledo) 
Francisco Javier Martínez Fernández (15 Mar 2003 – )

See also
Roman Catholicism in Spain

References

External links
Official site
Catholic-Hierarchy 
GCatholic.org 

Granada
Dioceses established in the 3rd century
Roman Catholic dioceses in Spain